Krauze is the Polish form of the German surname Krause. Notable people with the surname include: 

 Zygmunt Krauze (born 1938), Polish composer
 Andrzej Krauze (born 1947), Polish-born British cartoonist and illustrator
 Enrique Krauze (born 1947), Mexican historian, essayist and publisher
 Krzysztof Krauze (1953 – 2014), Polish film director, cinematographer and actor
 León Krauze (born 1975), Mexican journalist

See also
 Kraus
 Krause
 Krauss
 Krausz

Polish-language surnames
Surnames from nicknames